The 1902 Manitoba Hockey Association (MHA) season consisted of a four game series between the Winnipeg HC and Winnipeg Victorias. As the Victorias were the defending Stanley Cup holder, they would play two challenges, against Toronto and Montreal.

Regular season

Final standing

Stanley Cup challenges 

As Stanley Cup champion, the Victorias accepted a challenge from Toronto Wellingtons, champions of the Ontario Hockey Association (OHA), played during the regular season. The first game was played under Ontario rules, the second under Manitoba rules. Unusually, in the first game a goal was scored by Rod Flett of Winnipeg, however this goal was into his own net. No Toronto player is credited for the goal, Mr. Flett is. Winnipeg would win the series 5–3, 5–3 (2–0).

Winnipeg vs. Toronto Wellingtons 

Flett scored for Toronto (own goal)

Newspaper accounts omit the goal-scorers for the game.

Winnipeg vs. Montreal 

After the Montreal HC won the 1902 CAHL title in March, they promptly sent a challenge to the Winnipeg Victorias and a best-of-three series was arranged. The season was mild, and there was an inch of water on the slushy ice for game one. Tony Gingras scored the only goal of game one and Winnipeg shut out Montreal, 1–0. Ice conditions improved for game two an Montreal shut out Winnipeg 5–0. In game three, Montreal took an early 2–0 lead after eleven minutes and then held on for a 2–1 victory. Winnipeg attacked furiously at the end, and Montreal's effort was described as "little men of iron" by Montreal Star sports editor Peter Spanjaardt. With the victory, the Montreal club won the Cup for the first time since 1894.

Jack Marshall of Montreal, who had played for the Winnipeg team in the previous year, faced his old team and scored three goals, including the series clincher. Art Hooper also scored three for Montreal.

Winnipeg Victorias January 1902 Stanley Cup champions

See also 
 List of Stanley Cup champions

References 
 
 

Notes

Manitoba Hockey Association seasons
Man